Ciné-Ressources is a union catalogue of the libraries and archives of French cinema, created on 22 August 2007 and managed by the Cinémathèque française.

References

External links 
 Catalogue de la Cinémathèque de Toulouse

Online film databases
French film websites